The yellow weaver, Parapercis gilliesii, is a sandperch, a species of marine fish in the genus Parapercis found only around New Zealand.

References
 
 
 Tony Ayling & Geoffrey Cox, Collins Guide to the Sea Fishes of New Zealand, (William Collins Publishers Ltd, Auckland, New Zealand 1982) 

Pinguipedidae
Endemic marine fish of New Zealand
Taxa named by Frederick Hutton (scientist)
Fish described in 1879